The anthophytes are a grouping of plant taxa bearing flower-like reproductive structures. They were formerly thought to be a clade comprising plants bearing flower-like structures.  The group contained the angiosperms - the extant flowering plants, such as roses and grasses - as well as the Gnetales and the extinct Bennettitales.

Detailed morphological and molecular studies have shown that the group is not actually monophyletic, with proposed floral homologies of the gnetophytes and the angiosperms having evolved in parallel.

Some more recent studies have used the word anthophyte to describe a group which includes the angiosperms and a variety of fossils (glossopterids, Pentoxylon, Bennettitales, and Caytonia), but not the Gnetales.

23,420 species of vascular plant have been recorded in South Africa, making it the sixth most species-rich country in the world and the most species-rich country on the African continent. Of these, 153 species are considered to be threatened. Nine biomes have been described in South Africa: Fynbos, Succulent Karoo, desert, Nama Karoo, grassland, savanna, Albany thickets, the Indian Ocean coastal belt, and forests.

The 2018 South African National Biodiversity Institute's National Biodiversity Assessment plant checklist lists 35,130 taxa in the phyla Anthocerotophyta (hornworts (6)), Anthophyta (flowering plants (33534)), Bryophyta (mosses (685)), Cycadophyta (cycads (42)), Lycopodiophyta (Lycophytes(45)), Marchantiophyta (liverworts (376)), Pinophyta (conifers (33)), and Pteridophyta (cryptogams (408)).

Listing
The flowering plant diversity checklists include historical taxa recorded from the region, and the recognised taxa with which they are considered synonymous. Endemic, indigenous, and invasive taxa are labelled.

Acorales
List of Acorales of South Africa – Order: Acorales,

One family is represented:
 Family:Acoraceae, (1 species) 
Acorus calamus L. not indigenous

Alismatales
List of Alismatales of South Africa – Order: Alismatales.

11 families are represented:
 Alismataceae,
 Aponogetonaceae,
 Araceae,
 Cymodoceaceae,
 Hydrocharitaceae,
 Juncaginaceae,
 Lemnaceae,
 Limnocharitaceae,
 Potamogetonaceae,
 Ruppiaceae,
 Zosteraceae

Apiales
List of Apiales of South Africa – Order: Apiales,

Two families are represented:
 Apiaceae 
 Pittosporaceae

Aquifoliales
List of Aquifoliales of South Africa – Order: Aquifoliales,

One family is represented:
 Family: Aquifoliaceae,
 Ilex crocea Thunb. accepted as Elaeodendron croceum (Thunb.) DC.
 Ilex mitis (L.) Radlk. indigenous
 Ilex mitis (L.) Radlk. var. mitis, indigenous

Arecales
List of Arecales of South Africa – Order: Arecales:

One family is represented:
 Family: Arecaceae,
 Borassus aethiopum Mart. indigenous
 Hyphaene coriacea Gaertn. indigenous
 Hyphaene petersiana Klotzsch ex Mart. indigenous
 Jubaeopsis caffra Becc. endemic
 Livistona chinensis (Jacq.) R.Br. ex Mart. not indigenous, cultivated
 Phoenix canariensis Chabaud, not indigenous, cultivated, invasive
 Phoenix reclinata Jacq. indigenous
 Raphia australis Oberm. & Strey, indigenous
 Washingtonia filifera (L.Linden) H.Wendl. not indigenous, cultivated
 Washingtonia robusta H.Wendl. not indigenous, cultivated, invasive

Asparagales
List of Asparagales of South Africa – Order: Asparagales,

14 families are represented:
 Agapanthaceae 
 Agavaceae 
 Alliaceae 
 Amaryllidaceae 
 Asparagaceae 
 Asphodelaceae 
 Hemerocallidaceae 
 Hyacinthaceae 
 Hypoxidaceae 
 Iridaceae 
 Lanariaceae 
 Orchidaceae 
 Ruscaceae 
 Tecophilaeaceae

Asterales
List of Asterales of South Africa – Order: Asterales,

Five families are represented:
 Family: Asteraceae,
 Family: Campanulaceae,
 Family: Goodeniaceae,
 Family: Lobeliaceae,
 Family: Menyanthaceae,

Boraginales
List of Boraginales of South Africa – Order: Boraginales,

One family is represented:
 Family: Boraginaceae

Brassicales
List of Brassicales of South Africa – Order: Brassicales,

Six families are represented:
 Family: Brassicaceae,
 Family: Capparaceae,
 Family: Cleomaceae,
 Family: Resedaceae,
 Family: Salvadoraceae,
 Family: Tropaeolaceae,

Bruniales 
List of Bruniales of South Africa – Order: Bruniales,

One family is represented:
 Family: Bruniaceae,

Buxales
List of Buxales of South Africa – Order: Buxales,

One family is represented:
 Family: Buxaceae,
 Buxus macowanii Oliv. endemic
 Buxus natalensis (Oliv.) Hutch. endemic

Canellales
List of Canellales of South Africa – Order: Canellales,

One family is represented:
 Family: Canellaceae,
 Warburgia salutaris (G.Bertol.) Chiov. indigenous

Caryophyllales
List of Caryophyllales of South Africa – Order: Caryophyllales,

21 families are represented:
 Family: Aizoaceae,
 Family: Amaranthaceae,
 Family: Anacampserotaceae,
 Family: Basellaceae,
 Family: Cactaceae,
 Family: Caryophyllaceae,
 Family: Corbichoniaceae,
 Family: Didiereaceae,
 Family: Droseraceae,
 Family: Frankeniaceae,
 Family: Gisekiaceae,
 Family: Kewaceae,
 Family: Limeaceae,
 Family: Lophiocarpaceae,
 Family: Molluginaceae,
 Family: Nyctaginaceae,
 Family: Phytolaccaceae,
 Family: Plumbaginaceae,
 Family: Polygonaceae,
 Family: Portulacaceae,
 Family: Tamaricaceae,

Celastrales
List of Celastrales of South Africa – Order: Celastrales,

One family is represented:
 Family: Celastraceae,

Ceratophyllales
List of Ceratophyllales of South Africa – Order: Ceratophyllales,

One family is represented:

Family: Ceratophyllaceae,
 Ceratophyllum demersum L. indigenous
 Ceratophyllum demersum L. var. demersum, indigenous
 Ceratophyllum demersum L. var. demersum forma demersum, accepted as Ceratophyllum demersum L. var. demersum, present
 Ceratophyllum muricatum Cham. indigenous
 Ceratophyllum muricatum Cham. subsp. muricatum, indigenous
 Ceratophyllum submersum L. indigenous
 Ceratophyllum submersum L. subsp. muricatum (Cham.) Wilmot-Dear var. echinatum, accepted as Ceratophyllum muricatum Cham. subsp. muricatum, present
 Ceratophyllum submersum L. subsp. submersum var. submersum, indigenous

Commelinales
List of Commelinales of South Africa – Order: Commelinales,

Three families are represented:
 Family: Commelinaceae,
 Family: Haemodoraceae,
 Family: Pontederiaceae,

Cornales
List of Cornales of South Africa – Order: Cornales,

Four families are represented:
 Family: Curtisiaceae,
 Curtisia dentata (Burm.f.) C.A.Sm. indigenous
 Family: Grubbiaceae,
 Grubbia rosmarinifolia P.J.Bergius, indigenous
 Grubbia rosmarinifolia P.J.Bergius subsp. gracilis (T.M.Salter) Carlquist, endemic
 Grubbia rosmarinifolia P.J.Bergius subsp. hirsuta (E.Mey. ex DC.) Carlquist, endemic
 Grubbia rosmarinifolia P.J.Bergius subsp. rosmarinifolia var. pinifolia, endemic
 Grubbia rosmarinifolia P.J.Bergius subsp. rosmarinifolia var. rosmarinifolia, endemic
 Grubbia rourkei Carlquist, endemic
 Grubbia tomentosa (Thunb.) Harms, endemic
 Family: Hydrostachyaceae,
 Hydrostachys polymorpha Klotzsch ex A.Br. indigenous
 Family: Loasaceae,
 Kissenia capensis Endl. indigenous

Crossosomatales
List of Crossosomatales of South Africa – Order: Crossosomatales,

Two families are represented:
 Family: Aphloiaceae,
 Aphloia theiformis (Vahl) Benn. indigenous
 Family: Geissolomataceae,
 Geissoloma marginatum (L.) Juss. endemic

Cucurbitales
List of Cucurbitales of South Africa – Order: Cucurbitales,

Two families are represented:
 Family: Begoniaceae,
 Family: Cucurbitaceae,

Dioscoreales
List of Dioscoreales of South Africa – Order: Dioscoreales,

Three families are represented:
 Family: Burmanniaceae,
 Family: Dioscoreaceae,
 Family: Nartheciaceae,

Dipsacales
List of Dipsacales of South Africa – Order: Dipsacales,

Three families are represented:
 Family: Caprifoliaceae,
 Family: Dipsacaceae,
 Family: Valerianaceae,

Ericales
List of Ericales of South Africa – Order: Ericales,

11 families are represented:
 Family: Actinidiaceae,
 Family: Balsaminaceae,
 Family: Ebenaceae,
 Family: Ericaceae,
 Family: Lecythidaceae,
 Family: Maesaceae,
 Family: Myrsinaceae,
 Family: Primulaceae,
 Family: Roridulaceae,
 Family: Sapotaceae,
 Family: Theophrastaceae,

Escallionales
List of Escalloniales of South Africa – Order: Escalloniales,

One family is represented:

Family: Escalloniaceae,
 Choristylis rhamnoides Harv., accepted as Itea rhamnoides (Harv.) Kubitzki, indigenous
 Itea rhamnoides (Harv.) Kubitzki, indigenous

Fabales
List of Fabales of South Africa – Order: Fabales,

Two families are represented:
 Family: Fabaceae,
 Family: Polygalaceae,

Fagales
List of Fagales of South Africa – Order: Fagales,

Five families are represented:
 Family: Betulaceae,
 Family: Casuarinaceae,
 Family: Fagaceae,
 Family: Juglandaceae,
 Family: Myricaceae,

Gentianales
List of Gentianales of South Africa – Order: Gentianales,

Five families are represented:
 Family: Apocynaceae,
 Family: Asclepiadaceae,
 Family: Gentianaceae,
 Family: Loganiaceae,
 Family: Rubiaceae,

Geraniales
List of Geraniales of South Africa – Order: Geraniales,

Two families are represented:
 Family: Geraniaceae,
 Family: Melianthaceae,

Gunnerales 
List of Gunnerales of South Africa – Order: Gunnerales,

Two families are represented:
 Family: Gunneraceae,
 Gunnera perpensa L. indigenous
 Family: Myrothamnaceae,
 Myrothamnus flabellifolius Welw. indigenous

Huertales
List of Huerteales of South Africa – Order: Huerteales,

One family is represented:
 Family: Gerrardinaceae,
 Genus Gerrardina Gerrardina foliosa Oliv. indigenous

Icacinales
List of Icacinales of South Africa – Order: Icacinales,

One family is represented:
Family: Icacinaceae,
 Genus Apodytes Apodytes abbottii Potgieter & A.E.van Wyk, endemic
 Apodytes dimidiata E.Mey. ex Arn. indigenous
 Apodytes dimidiata E.Mey. ex Arn. subsp. Dimidiata, indigenous
 Apodytes geldenhuysii A.E.van Wyk & Potgieter, endemic
 Genus Cassinopsis Cassinopsis ilicifolia (Hochst.) Kuntze, indigenous
 Cassinopsis tinifolia Harv. indigenous
 Genus Pyrenacantha Pyrenacantha grandiflora Baill. indigenous
 Pyrenacantha kaurabassana Baill. indigenous
 Pyrenacantha scandens Planch. ex Harv. indigenous

Lamiales
List of Lamiales of South Africa – Order: Lamiales,

15 families are represented:
 Family: Acanthaceae,
 Family: Bignoniaceae,
 Family: Gesneriaceae,
 Family: Lamiaceae,
 Family: Lentibulariaceae,
 Family: Linderniaceae,
 Family: Martyniaceae,
 Family: Oleaceae,
 Family: Orobanchaceae,
 Family: Paulowniaceae,
 Family: Pedaliaceae,
 Family: Plantaginaceae,
 Family: Scrophulariaceae,
 Family: Stilbaceae,
 Family: Verbenaceae,

Laurales
List of Laurales of South Africa – Order: Laurales,

Two families are represented:
 Family: Lauraceae,
 Genus Cassytha Cassytha ciliolata Nees, indigenous
 Cassytha filiformis L. indigenous
 Cassytha pondoensis Engl. endemic
 Cassytha pondoensis Engl. var. pondoensis, not indigenous, naturalised
 Genus Cinnamomum Cinnamomum camphora (L.) J.Presl, indigenous
 Genus Cryptocarya Cryptocarya angustifolia E.Mey. ex Meisn. endemic
 Cryptocarya latifolia Sond.	not indigenous, naturalised, invasive
 Cryptocarya liebertiana Engl. endemic
 Cryptocarya myrtifolia Stapf, endemic
 Cryptocarya transvaalensis Burtt Davy, indigenous
 Cryptocarya woodii Engl. endemic
 Cryptocarya wyliei Stapf, indigenous
 Genus Dahlgrenodendron Dahlgrenodendron natalense (J.H.Ross) J.J.M.van der Merwe & A.E.van Wyk, indigenous
 Genus Gyrocarpus Gyrocarpus americanus Jacq. endemic
 Gyrocarpus americanus Jacq. subsp. africanus Kubitzki, endemic
 Genus Litsea Litsea glutinosa (Lour.) C.B.Rob. not indigenous, naturalised, invasive
 Litsea sebifera Pers.  not indigenous, naturalised
 Genus Ocotea Ocotea bullata (Burch.) Baill. indigenous
 Ocotea kenyensis (Chiov.) Robyns & R.Wilczek, indigenous
 Genus Persea Persea americana Mill. not indigenous, cultivated, naturalised, invasive
 Family: Monimiaceae,
 Genus Xymalos Xymalos monospora (Harv.) Baill. indigenous

Liliales
List of Liliales of South Africa – Order: Liliales,

Five families are represented:
 Family: Alstroemeriaceae,
 Family: Colchicaceae,
 Family: Liliaceae,
 Family: Melanthiaceae,
 Family: Smilacaceae,

Magnoliales
List of Magnoliales of South Africa – Order: Magnoliales,

One family is represented:
 Family: Annonaceae,

Malpighiales
List of Malpighiales of South Africa – Order: Malpighiales,

20 families are represented:
 Family: Achariaceae,
 Family: Chrysobalanaceae,
 Family: Clusiaceae,
 Family: Dichapetalaceae,
 Family: Elatinaceae,
 Family: Erythroxylaceae,
 Family: Euphorbiaceae,
 Family: Hypericaceae,
 Family: Linaceae,
 Family: Malpighiaceae,
 Family: Ochnaceae,
 Family: Passifloraceae,
 Family: Phyllanthaceae,
 Family: Picrodendraceae,
 Family: Podostemaceae,
 Family: Putranjivaceae,
 Family: Rhizophoraceae,
 Family: Salicaceae,
 Family: Turneraceae,
 Family: Violaceae,

Malvales
List of Malvales of South Africa – Order: Malvales,

Six families are represented:
 Family: Balanophoraceae,
 Family: Cistaceae,
 Family: Cytinaceae,
 Family: Malvaceae,
 Family: Neuradaceae,
 Family: Thymelaeaceae,

Myrtales
List of Myrtales of South Africa – Order: Myrtales,

10 families are represented:
 Family: Combretaceae,
 Family: Heteropyxidaceae,
 Family: Lythraceae,
 Family: Melastomataceae,
 Family: Memecylaceae,
 Family: Myrtaceae,
 Family: Oliniaceae,
 Family: Onagraceae,
 Family: Penaeaceae,
 Family: Rhynchocalycaceae,

Nymphaeales
List of Nymphaeales of South Africa – Order: Nymphaeales,

Two families are represented:

Family: Cabombaceae,
 Genus Brasenia Brasenia schreberi J.F.Gmel. indigenous

Family: Nymphaeaceae,
 Genus Nymphaea Nymphaea lotus L. indigenous
 Nymphaea mexicana Zucc. not indigenous, naturalised, invasive
 Nymphaea nouchali Burm.f. indigenous
 Nymphaea nouchali Burm.f. var. caerulea (Savigny) Verdc. indigenous
 Nymphaea nouchali Burm.f. var. zanzibariensis (Casp.) Verdc. indigenous

Oxalidales
List of Oxalidales of South Africa – Order: Oxalidales,

Four families are represented:
 Family: Connaraceae,
 Family: Cunoniaceae,
 Family: Elaeocarpaceae,
 Family: Oxalidaceae,

Pandanales
List of Pandanales of South Africa – Order: Pandanales,

One family is represented:
 Family: Velloziaceae,

Piperales
List of Piperales of South Africa – Order: Piperales,

Four families are represented:

Family: Aristolochiaceae,
 Genus Aristolochia Aristolochia elegans Mast. not indigenous, naturalised, invasive

Family: Hydnoraceae,
 Genus Hydnora Hydnora abyssinica A.Br. indigenous
 Hydnora africana Thunb. indigenous
 Hydnora johannis Becc. var. johannis accepted as Hydnora abyssinica A.Br. present
 Hydnora triceps Drege & E.Mey. indigenous
 Hydnora visseri Bolin, E.Maass & Musselman, indigenous

Family: Piperaceae,
 Genus Peperomia Peperomia blanda (Jacq.) Kunth, indigenous
 Peperomia blanda (Jacq.) Kunth var. leptostachya (Hook. & Arn.) Dull, accepted as Peperomia blanda (Jacq.) Kunth, present
 Peperomia retusa (L.f.) A.Dietr. indigenous
 Peperomia retusa (L.f.) A.Dietr. var. bachmannii (C.DC.) Dull, indigenous
 Peperomia retusa (L.f.) A.Dietr. var. retusa,  indigenous
 Peperomia rotundifolia (L.) Kunth, indigenous
 Peperomia tetraphylla (G.Forst.) Hook. & Arn. indigenous
 Genus Piper Piper capense L.f. var. capense, indigenous

Family: Saururaceae,
 Genus Houttuynia Houttuynia cordata Thunb. not indigenous, naturalised, invasive

Poales
List of Poales of South Africa – Order: Poales,

10 families are represented:
 Family: Bromeliaceae,
 Family: Cyperaceae,
 Family: Eriocaulaceae,
 Family: Flagellariaceae,
 Family: Juncaceae,
 Family: Poaceae,
 Family: Restionaceae,
 Family: Thurniaceae,
 Family: Typhaceae,
 Family: Xyridaceae,

Proteales
List of Proteales of South Africa – Order: Proteales,

Two families are represented:
 Family: Platanaceae,
 Family: Proteaceae,

Ranunculales
List of Ranunculales of South Africa – Order: Ranunculales,

Five families are represented:
 Family: Berberidaceae,
 Family: Fumariaceae,
 Family: Menispermaceae,
 Family: Papaveraceae,
 Family: Ranunculaceae,

Rosales 
List of Rosales of South Africa – Order: Rosales,

Six families are represented:
 Family: Cannabaceae,
 Family: Moraceae,
 Family: Rhamnaceae,
 Family: Rosaceae,
 Family: Ulmaceae,
 Family: Urticaceae,

Santalales
List of Santalales of South Africa – Order: Santalales,

Three families are represented:
 Family: Loranthaceae,
 Family: Olacaceae,
 Family: Santalaceae,

Sapindales
List of Sapindales of South Africa – Order: Sapindales,

Eight families are represented:
 Family: Anacardiaceae,
 Family: Burseraceae,
 Family: Kirkiaceae,
 Family: Meliaceae,
 Family: Peganaceae,
 Family: Rutaceae,
 Family: Sapindaceae,
 Family: Simaroubaceae,

Saxifragales 
List of Saxifragales of South Africa – Order: Saxifragales,

Four families are represented:
 Family: Altingiaceae,
 Family: Crassulaceae,
 Family: Haloragaceae,
 Family: Hamamelidaceae,

Solanales
List of Solanales of South Africa – Order: Solanales,

Four families are represented:
 Family: Convolvulaceae,
 Family: Montiniaceae,
 Family: Solanaceae,
 Family: Sphenocleaceae,

Vahliales
List of Vahliales of South Africa – Order: Vahliales,

One family is represented:

Family: Vahliaceae,
 Genus Vahlia Vahlia capensis (L.f.) Thunb. indigenous
 Vahlia capensis (L.f.) Thunb. subsp. capensis, indigenous
 Vahlia capensis (L.f.) Thunb. subsp. ellipticifolia Bridson, indigenous
 Vahlia capensis (L.f.) Thunb. subsp. vulgaris Bridson var. latifolia, endemic
 Vahlia capensis (L.f.) Thunb. subsp. vulgaris Bridson var. linearis, indigenous
 Vahlia capensis (L.f.) Thunb. subsp. vulgaris Bridson var. longifolia, indigenous
 Vahlia capensis (L.f.) Thunb. subsp. vulgaris Bridson var. vulgaris, indigenous

Vitales
List of Vitales of South Africa – Order: Vitales,

One family is represented:
 Family: Vitaceae,

Zingiberales
List of Zingiberales of South Africa – Order: Zingiberales,

Five families are represented:

Family: Cannaceae,
 Genus Canna Canna edulis Ker Gawl. accepted as Canna indica L. not indigenous, naturalised
 Canna flaccida Salisb. not indigenous, naturalised, invasive
 Canna glauca L. not indigenous, naturalised
 Canna indica L. not indigenous, naturalised, invasive
 Canna x generalis L.H.Bailey, not indigenous, naturalised, invasive

Family: Marantaceae,
 Genus Maranta Maranta leuconeura E.Morren, not indigenous, cultivated, naturalised

Family: Musaceae,
 Genus Ensete Ensete ventricosum (Welw.) Cheesman, indigenous

Family: Strelitziaceae,
 Genus Strelitzia Strelitzia alba (L.f.) Skeels, endemic
 Strelitzia caudata R.A.Dyer, indigenous
 Strelitzia juncea (Ker Gawl.) Link, endemic
 Strelitzia nicolai Regel & Korn. indigenous
 Strelitzia parvifolia W.T.Aiton var. juncea Ker Gawl. accepted as]]Strelitzia juncea]] (Ker Gawl.) Link, indigenous
 Strelitzia reginae Banks, indigenous
 Strelitzia reginae Banks subsp. mzimvubuensis Van Jaarsv. indigenous
 Strelitzia reginae Banks subsp. reginae, indigenous
 Strelitzia reginae Banks var. juncea (Ker Gawl.) H.E.Moore	Strelitzia juncea (Ker Gawl.) Link, indigenous

Family: Zingiberaceae,
 Genus Alpinia Alpinia zerumbet (Pers.) B.L.Burtt & R.M.Sm., not indigenous, naturalised, invasive
 Genus Hedychium Hedychium coccineum Buch.-Ham. ex Sm., not indigenous, cultivated, naturalised, invasive
 Hedychium coronarium J.Konig, not indigenous, naturalised, invasive
 Hedychium flavescens Roscoe, not indigenous, naturalised, invasive
 Hedychium gardnerianum Ker Gawl., not indigenous, naturalised, invasive
 Genus Siphonochilus Siphonochilus aethiopicus (Schweinf.) B.L.Burtt, indigenous
 Siphonochilus natalensis (Schltr. & K.Schum.) J.M.Wood & Franks, accepted as Siphonochilus aethiopicus'' (Schweinf.) B.L.Burtt, present

Zygophyllales
List of Zygophyllales of South Africa – Order: Zygophyllales,

One family is represented:
 Family: Zygophyllaceae,

See also

References

South African plant biodiversity lists
Angiosperms